Saya Ito (born 7 January 1999) is a Japanese kickboxer and Nak Muay, currently competing in the pinweight division of Battle of Muaythai. She is the current World Muaythai Council World Mini Flyweight champion and Battle of Muaythai Light Flyweight champion.

A professional competitor since 2011, she is the former WPMF two-time World and one-time Japanese Pinweight champion and the former WBC Muaythai World Mini Flyweight Champion.

Muay thai career

WPMF title fights

First WPMF World Pinweight title reign
Ito made her debut against Phetseenung Sitjeephon on 12 August 2011, in Bangkok, Thailand. She won the fight by decision. She likewise defeated Muangsee Or.Wanchai by decision at Miracle Muay Thai Festival on 17 March 2012. In her third professional fight, Ito was scheduled to face Hongkwa for the Onesgongchai Minimumweight title at the Queen's Birthday event on 12 August 2012. She won the fight by unanimous decision.

For her fourth professional fight, Ito was scheduled to face Pheknongsi Mor.Kasetsart for the WPMF World Pinmweight title at Queen's Cup - Sanam Luang on 11 August 2013. She won the fight by unanimous decision.

Ito was scheduled to face Hae-yeong Park at Muay Lok 2014 1st on 27 April 2014. She beat Park by unanimous decision.

Ito was scheduled to fight Haru Tajima for the WPMF Japan Pinweight title at Tenkaichi 71 on 18 May 2014. Ito suffered her first professional loss, losing the fight by unanimous decision, with all three judges scoring the bout as 29-28. This was followed by her first professional draw, with Momi at Muay Lok 2014 2nd on 13 July 2014. Ito suffered her second professional loss to Sylvie von Duuglas-Ittu, by unanimous decision, at the Queen's Cup event on 12 August 2014.

WPMF Japan Pinweight champion
Ito once again challenged Haru Tajima for the WPMF Japan Pinweight title at Tenkaichi 73 on 7 September 2014. Ito won the rematch by unanimous decision.

Ito was scheduled to face Kira☆Yuuki at WPMF JAPAN The Battle of Muaythai VI on 7 December 2014. Ito won the fight by unanimous decision. She was next scheduled to fight Somying sor Phaitong at MBK Fights on 12 February 2015. Ito won the fight by unanimous decision.

Ito made her first title defense at The Battle of Muaythai VII × Muay Lok on 5 April 2015, in a rematch with Kira☆Chihiro. Ito was once again victorious against Kira, winning by unanimous decision.

Ito was scheduled to meet Superball Paradorngym in a non-title bout at MuayThaiOpen31 on 18 June 2015. She won the fight by a fourth-round technical knockout.

Ito made her second title defense against Yoshimi Hatayama at The Battle of Muay Thai 9 on 19 July 2015. She won the fight by unanimous decision.

Second WPMF World Pinweight title reign
Ito was scheduled to challenge Ayaka Miyauchi for the WPMF World Pinweight title at Suk Weerasakreck 10 on 27 September 2015. Ito won the fight by unanimous decision.

Ito met Rojana Rombogym in a non-title bout at MAT vol.1 on 19 December 2015. She won the bout by a fifth-round technical knockout.

Ito made her first world title defense at M-ONE on 21 March 2016, in a rematch with Ayaka Miyauchi. She won the fight by majority decision.

Ito was scheduled to face Kaeworka Kudenmuaythaigym at Muay Lok 2017 2nd on 18 June 2017, in a non-title bout. She won the fight by unanimous decision.

WMC and WBC Muaythai title fights
Ito was scheduled to face Faachiangrai Sor.Sanchai, for the WMC Miniflyweight title, at Muay Lok 2017 3rd on 11 August 2017. Ito won the fight by unanimous decision, with all three judges scoring the fight 49-48.

After winning the WMC title, Ito was scheduled to face Yodting Sit Namkabuan for the WBC Muay Thai World Mini Flyweight title at NJKF 2017 4th on 26 November 2017. Ito won the fight by unanimous decision, with scores of 49-47, 50-46 and 50-46.

Following a 13-month layoff, Ito was scheduled to face the future RISE Flyweight champion Manazo Kobayashi at KING OF KNOCK OUT 2018 on 9 December 2018. It was Ito's only fight of the year. Kobayashi won the closely contested bout by majority decision, with two of the judges scoring the fight as 49-48 for Kobayashi, while the third judge scored it as a 49-49 draw.

Battle of Muaythai

BoM Atomweight champion
Ito was scheduled to face Nana Okuwaki at The Battle Of Muay Thai Season II vol.6 Part 1 on 7 December 2019. Ito won the fight by unanimous decision, with scores of 50-45, 50-46, 50-45.

Ito was scheduled to fight the former NJKF Minerva Japan Pinweight champion Ayaka at RISE GIRLS POWER 2 on 11 February 2020. Ayaka won the fight by a third-round knockout. It was the first knockout loss of Ito's professional career.

Ito was scheduled to compete at the Muelok Hachioji 2020 event on 26 April 2020. The event was later cancelled, due to the COVID-19 pandemic.

Following a ten-month layoff, Ito was scheduled to face Shoko JSK at BOM WAVE 03 ~ Get Over The COVID-19 on 6 December 2020. Ito won the fight by unanimous decision, with scores of 49-48, 49-47 and 49-47.

BoM Pinweight champion
Ito was scheduled to rematch Ayaka, for the inaugural Battle of Muay Thai Pinweight title, at Muay Lok 2021 Hachioji on 25 April 2021. Ito's corner furthermore promised a one million yen win reward if Ayaka won. She won the rematch by unanimous decision.

Ito was scheduled to fight Mirey at The Battle Of Muay Thai WAVE 05 - Get over the COVID-19 on 4 July 2021. Ito won the fight by unanimous decision, with all three judges scoring the bout 29-28 in her favor.

Ito was scheduled to face the reigning RISE Atomweight champion Koyuki Miyazaki at RISE GIRLS POWER 5 on 12 September 2021. It was her second career fight under kickboxing rules. The fight was ruled a draw after the first three rounds were contested, with two of the judges being split as to the winner of the bout, while the third judge scored it as an even draw. Miyazaki was awarded the majority decision, after an extra round was fought.

BoM Light Flyweight champion
Ito was scheduled to fight the #5 ranked NJKF light flyweight RINA for the inaugural Battle of Muay Thai Light Flyweight title at BOM WAVE 06 – Get Over The COVID-19 on 7 November 2021. She won by unanimous decision.

Ito was booked to face Namwan Sor.Khongkraphan for the vacant IPCC World Atomweight title at MuayLok 2022 on May 15, 2022. She won the fight by unanimous decision, with scores of 49–48, 49–48 and 49–47.

Ito faced Petchchumpae Highlandgym at the July 31, 2022, Muay Thai Super Champ event. It was Ito's first fight in Thailand since her draw against Kenkaew Korgonkiew in 2016. The fight was contested at 48 kg. She won the fight by decision.

Ito took part in a -50 kg tournament, organized by Muaythai Super Champ, the semifinals of which were held on October 30, 2022. She was placed in the A-block tournament, the winner of which would face the winner of the B-block tournament in December. Ito won both the semifinal bout against Nancy Tnusu Yala and the final bout against Sabah Chergui in the same manner, by decision. Ito faced the B-block tournament winner Lisa Brierley in the overall tournament final. She lost the fight by unanimous decision.

Ito faced Duangdawnoi Looksaikongdin in a 47.5 kg bout at Suk Wan Kingthong on February 19, 2023. The pair was previously booked to face each other in April and June of 2016, although the fight was cancelled both times for undisclosed reasons. Ito lost the fight by unanimous decision, with two scorecards of 49–47 and one scorecard of 49–48.

Championships and accomplishments

Professional
World Boxing Council Muaythai
 2017 WBC Muaythai World Mini Flyweight Champion

World Muaythai Council
 2017 WMC World Mini Flyweight Champion

World Professional Muaythai Federation
 2013 WPMF World Pinweight Champion 
 2015 WPMF World Pinweight Champion (1 Defense)
 2014 WPMF Japanese Pinweight Champion (2 Defenses)

The Battle of Muay Thai
 2021 BoM Pinweight Champion 
 2021 BoM Light Flyweight Champion

International Professional Combat Council
 2022 IPCC World Atomweight Champion

OneSongchai
 2012 S-1 Minimumweight World Champion

Amateur
 2009 M-1 Junior -35kg Champion
 2010 M-1 Junior Women -40kg Champion
 Thepprasit Stadium -37kg Champion
 2011 M-1 Junior -45kg Champion
 2011 WINDY Super Fight -40kg Champion
 2011 TOP RUN Queen Tournament -45kg Winner
 2012 M-1 Junior -45kg Champion
 2012 M-1 Junior -50kg Champion

Fight record

|-  style="text-align:center; background:#fbb;"
| 2023-02-19 || Loss ||align=left| Duangdawnoi Looksaikongdin || Suk Wan Kingthong  || Tokyo, Japan || Decision (Unanimous)|| 5 || 3:00 

|-  style="text-align:center; background:#fbb;"
| 2022-12-18 || Loss||align=left| Lisa Brierley || Muay Thai Super Champ, Tournament Final  || Bangkok, Thailand || Decision (Unanimous)|| 3 || 3:00 
|-
! style=background:white colspan=9 |

|-  style="text-align:center; background:#cfc;"
| 2022-10-30 || Win ||align=left| Sabah Chergui || Muay Thai Super Champ, A-block Tournament Final  || Bangkok, Thailand || Decision || 3 || 3:00

|-  style="text-align:center; background:#cfc;"
| 2022-10-30 || Win ||align=left| Nancy Tnusu Yala || Muay Thai Super Champ, A-block Tournament Semi Final  || Bangkok, Thailand || Decision || 3||3:00

|-  style="text-align:center; background:#cfc;"
| 2022-07-31 || Win ||align=left| Petchchumpae Highlandgym || Muay Thai Super Champ  || Bangkok, Thailand || Decision  ||3 ||3:00
|-
|-  style="text-align:center; background:#cfc;"
| 2022-05-15|| Win||align=left| Namwan Sor.Khongkraphan|| MuayLok 2022  || Hachioji, Japan ||  Decision (Unanimous) || 5||2:00
|-
! style=background:white colspan=9 |

|-  style="text-align:center; background:#cfc;"
| 2021-11-07|| Win ||align=left| RINA || BOM WAVE 06 – Get Over The COVID-19  || Yokohama, Japan || Decision (Unanimous)  || 5||2:00
|-
! style=background:white colspan=9 |

|-  style="text-align:center; background:#fbb"
| 2021-09-12 || Loss || align=left| Koyuki Miyazaki || RISE GIRLS POWER 5|| Tokyo, Japan || Ext.R Decision (Majority)  ||4 ||3:00
|-  style="background:#cfc;"
| 2021-07-04|| Win ||align=left| Mirey || The Battle Of Muay Thai WAVE 05 - Get over the COVID-19 || Yokohama, Japan || Decision (Unanimous)  || 3 || 3:00
|-  bgcolor="#cfc"
| 2021-04-25|| Win ||align=left| Ayaka || Muay Lok 2021 Hachioji || Hachioji, Japan || Decision (Unanimous) || 5 || 2:00  
|-
! style=background:white colspan=9 |
|-  style="background:#cfc;"
| 2020-12-06 || Win ||align=left| Shoko JSK|| BOM WAVE 03 ~ Get Over The COVID-19 || Yokohama, Japan || Decision (Unanimous)  ||5 ||2:00
|-  bgcolor="#FFBBBB"
| 2020-02-11|| Loss||align=left| Ayaka || RISE GIRLS POWER 2 || Tokyo, Japan || KO (Punches) || 3 || 1:51 
|-
|-  bgcolor="#CCFFCC"
| 2019-12-07|| Win||align=left| Nana Okuwaki || The Battle Of Muay Thai Season II vol.6 Part 1 || Tokyo, Japan || Decision (Unanimous) || 3 || 3:00 

|-
|-  bgcolor="#FFBBBB"
| 2018-12-09|| Loss||align=left| Manazo Kobayashi || KING OF KNOCK OUT 2018 || Tokyo, Japan || Decision (Unanimous) || 5 || 2:00 
|-
|-  bgcolor="#CCFFCC"
| 2017-11-26|| Win||align=left| Yodting Sit Namkabuan || NJKF 2017 4th || Tokyo, Japan || Decision (Unanimous) || 5 || 3:00 
|-
! style=background:white colspan=9 |
|-
|-  bgcolor="#CCFFCC"
| 2017-08-11|| Win||align=left| Faachiangrai Sor.Sanchai || Muay Lok 2017 3rd || Tokyo, Japan || Decision (Unanimous) || 5 || 2:00 
|-
! style=background:white colspan=9 |
|-
|-  bgcolor="#CCFFCC"
| 2017-06-18|| Win||align=left| Kaeworka Kudenmuaythaigym|| Muay Lok 2017 2nd|| Tokyo, Japan || Decision (Unanimous) || 5 || 2:00
|-  bgcolor="#c5d2ea"
| 2016-04-08|| Draw||align=left| Kenkaew Korgonkiew||  || Bangkok, Thailand || Decision  || 5 || 2:00
|-  bgcolor="#CCFFCC"
| 2016-03-21|| Win||align=left| Little Tiger || M-ONE || Tokyo, Japan || Decision (Majority) || 5 || 2:00 
|-
! style=background:white colspan=9 |
|-  bgcolor="#CCFFCC"
| 2015-12-19|| Win||align=left| Rojana Rombogym|| MAT vol.1 || Tokyo, Japan || TKO (Punches) || 5 || 1:48
|-  bgcolor="#CCFFCC"
| 2015-09-27|| Win||align=left| Little Tiger || Suk Weerasakreck 10 || Tokyo, Japan || Decision (Unanimous) || 5 || 2:00 
|-
! style=background:white colspan=9 |
|-  bgcolor="#CCFFCC"
| 2015-08-21|| Win||align=left| Pellomanee Sippepaya||  || Pattaya, Thailand || Decision  || 5 || 2:00
|-  bgcolor="#CCFFCC"
| 2015-07-19|| Win||align=left| Yoshimi Hatayama || The Battle of Muay Thai 9 || Yokohama, Japan || Decision (Unanimous) || 5 || 2:00 
|-
! style=background:white colspan=9 |
|-
|-  bgcolor="#CCFFCC"
| 2015-06-28|| Win||align=left| Superball Paradorngym || MuayThaiOpen31	 || Tokyo, Japan || TKO (Punches) || 4 || 2:08
|-  bgcolor="#CCFFCC"
| 2015-04-05|| Win||align=left| Kira☆Chihiro || The Battle of Muaythai VII × Muay Lok || Tokyo, Japan || Decision (Unanimous) || 5 || 2:00 
|-
! style=background:white colspan=9 |
|-  bgcolor="#CCFFCC"
| 2015-03-28|| Win||align=left|  ||  || Pattaya, Thailand || KO  || 3 ||
|-  bgcolor="#CCFFCC"
| 2015-02-12|| Win||align=left| Somying sor Phaitong || MBK Fights || Bangkok, Thailand || Decision (Unanimous) || 3 || 3:00
|-  bgcolor="#CCFFCC"
| 2014-12-07|| Win||align=left| Kira☆Yuuki|| WPMF JAPAN The Battle of Muaythai VI || Yokohama, Japan || Decision (Unanimous) || 3 || 2:00
|-  bgcolor="#CCFFCC"
| 2014-09-07|| Win||align=left| Haru Tajima || Tenkaichi 73 || Okinawa, Japan || Decision (Unanimous) || 5 || 2:00 
|-
! style=background:white colspan=9 |
|-
|-  bgcolor="#FFBBBB"
| 2014-08-12|| Loss||align=left| Sylvie von Duuglas-Ittu || Queen's Cup || Bangkok, Thailand || Decision (Unanimous) || 5 || 2:00 
|-
|-  bgcolor="#c5d2ea"
| 2014-07-13|| Draw||align=left| Momi || Muay Lok 2014 2nd || Tokyo, Japan || Draw (Majority) || 3 || 2:00 
|-
|-  bgcolor="#FFBBBB"
| 2014-05-18|| Loss||align=left| Haru Tajima || Tenkaichi 71 || Tokyo, Japan || Decision (Unanimous) || 5 || 2:00 
|-
! style=background:white colspan=9 |
|-  bgcolor="#cfc"
| 2014-04-27|| Win||align=left| Hae-yeong Park || Muay Lok 2014 1st|| Tokyo, Japan || Decision (Unanimous) || 5 || 2:00
|-  bgcolor="#cfc"
| 2013-08-11|| Win||align=left| Pheknongsi Mor.Kasetsart || Queen's Cup - Sanam Luang || Bangkok, Thailand || Decision (Unanimous) || 5 || 2:00 
|-
! style=background:white colspan=9 |
|-  bgcolor="#cfc"
| 2012-08-12|| Win||align=left| Hongkwa || Queen's Cup|| Bangkok, Thailand || Decision (Unanimous) || 5 || 3:00 
|-
! style=background:white colspan=9 |
|-  bgcolor="#cfc"
| 2012-03-17|| Win||align=left| Muangsee Or.Wanchai|| Miracle Muay Thai Festival|| Ayutthaya, Thailand || Decision  || 5 || 2:00
|-  bgcolor="#cfc"
| 2011-08-12|| Win||align=left| Phetseenung Sitjeephon|| || Bangkok, Thailand || Decision  || 3 || 3:00 
|-
| colspan=9 | Legend:    

|-  bgcolor="#CCFFCC"
| 2012-12-09|| Win||align=left| Kenta Yoshinaga || M-1 Muay Thai Amateur 55 || Tokyo, Japan || Decision (Unanimous) || 3 || 2:00 
|-
! style=background:white colspan=9 |
|-  style="background:#cfc;"
| 2012-06-17|| Win|| align=left| Yukari Yamaguchi ||Muay Lok 2012 2nd|| Tokyo, Japan ||Decision (Majority) || 2 || 2:00
|-  bgcolor="#CCFFCC"
| 2012-05-27|| Win||align=left| Yuya Mori || M-1 Muay Thai Amateur 51 || Tokyo, Japan || Decision (Unanimous) || 3 || 2:00 
|-
! style=background:white colspan=9 |
|-  style="background:#fbb;"
| 2012-04-15|| Loss|| align=left| Kakuei Matsumoto ||All Japan Jr Kick Tournament -45kg, Semi Final|| Tokyo, Japan ||Decision  || 2 || 2:00
|-  style="background:#cfc;"
| 2012-04-15|| Win|| align=left|  ||All Japan Jr Kick Tournament -45kg, Quarter Final|| Tokyo, Japan ||Decision  || 2 || 2:00
|-  style="background:#cfc;"
| 2012-03-04|| Win|| align=left| Kota Nakano ||All Japan Jr Kick Kanto Selection Tournament -45kg, Final|| Tokyo, Japan || Decision  ||  2||2:00
|-  style="background:#cfc;"
| 2012-03-04|| Win|| align=left| Yuya Iwanami ||All Japan Jr Kick Kanto Selection Tournament -45kg, Semi Final|| Tokyo, Japan ||Decision  || 2 || 2:00
|-  bgcolor="#fbb"
| 2012-01-29|| Loss||align=left| Atsuki Senoo|| M-1 Muay Thai Amateur 48, M-1 Tournament -45kg Semi Final|| Chiba, Japan || Decision || 2 || 2:00
|-  bgcolor="#fbb"
| 2011-12-17|| Loss||align=left| Kira☆Chihiro || Jewels: 17th Ring, JEWELS U-15 Kick Tournament Final || Tokyo, Japan || Decision (Unanimous) || 2 || 2:00
|-  bgcolor="#CCFFCC"
| 2011-10-23|| Win||align=left| Kira☆Yuuki || DEEP KICK 8 - TOP RUN 2, Queen Tournament Final || Osaka, Japan || Decision (Unanimous) || 2 || 2:00 
|-
! style=background:white colspan=9 |
|-  bgcolor="#CCFFCC"
| 2011-10-23|| Win||align=left| Akane Komori || DEEP KICK 8 - TOP RUN 2, Queen Tournament Semi Final || Osaka, Japan || Decision (Unanimous) || 1 || 1:00
|-  bgcolor="#CCFFCC"
| 2011-09-11|| Win||align=left| Ryoka || Jewels: 16th Ring || Tokyo, Japan || Decision (Unanimous) || 2 || 2:00
|-  style="background:#cfc;"
| 2011-07-31|| Win|| align=left| Kaito Gibu ||M-1 Muay Thai Amateur 44 || Tokyo, Japan || Decision  || ||
|-  bgcolor="#CCFFCC"
| 2011-07-09|| Win||align=left| Kira☆Chihiro || Jewels: 15th Ring || Tokyo, Japan || Decision (Unanimous) || 2 || 2:00
|-  style="background:#cfc;"
| 2011-07-03|| Win|| align=left| Kira☆Chihiro||Muay Thai WINDY Super Fight in NAGOYA ～Muay Typhoon!～ || Nagoya, Japan || Decision   || 2||2:00
|-  style="background:#fbb;"
| 2011-06-19|| Loss || align=left| Miiri Sasaki ||M-1 Muay Thai Amateur 43 || Tokyo, Japan || Decision  || ||
|-
! style=background:white colspan=9 |
|-  style="background:#cfc;"
| 2011-04-29|| Win|| align=left| Kota Nakano ||Muay Thai WINDY Super Fight vol.6, Final || Tokyo, Japan || Decision   || 2||2:00
|-
! style=background:white colspan=9 |
|- style="background:#fbb;"
| 2011-02-20|| Loss|| align="left" | Tenshin Nasukawa ||  Muay Lok 2011 1st || Tokyo, Japan || Decision || 2 || 2:00
|-  style="background:#fbb;"
| 2010-11-07||Loss||align=left| Kaito Fukuda || Muay Thai WINDY Super Fight vol.5||Tokyo, Japan || Decision || 2||2:00 
|-
! style=background:white colspan=9 |
|-  style="background:#cfc;"
| 2010-11-07||Win ||align=left| Yuichi Suenaga || Muay Thai WINDY Super Fight vol.5||Tokyo, Japan || Decision || 2||2:00
|- style="background:#CCFFCC;"
| 2010-10-03|| Win || align="left" | Miiri Sasaki ||M-1 Muay Thai Amateur 37, Final ||Tokyo, Japan|| Decision || 2 ||
|-
! style=background:white colspan=9 |
|- style="background:#CCFFCC;"
| 2010-10-03|| Win || align="left" | NORI ||M-1 Muay Thai Amateur 37, Semi Final ||Tokyo, Japan|| TKO (Middle kick)|| 2 ||
|- style="background:#fbb;"
| 2010-08-01|| Loss || align="left" | Tenshin Nasukawa || Muay Lok Junior 35 kg Tournament, Final || Tokyo, Japan || Decision (Unanimous) || 3 || 2:00
|-
! style=background:white colspan=9 |
|- style="background:#cfc;"
| 2010-04-25|| Win || align="left" | Koya Saito || Muay Lok 2010 2nd || Tokyo, Japan || Decision (Unanimous) ||2 ||
|- style="background:#CCFFCC;"
| 2010-03-28|| Win || align="left" | Keigo Nagura ||M-1 Muay Thai Amateur 33 - M-1 Kid's CHAMPION CARNIVAL 2010||Tokyo, Japan|| Decision (Majority)|| 3 ||
|-
! style=background:white colspan=9 |
|- style="background:#CCFFCC;"
| 2009-12-13|| Win || align="left" | Keigo Nagura ||M-1 Muay Thai Amateur 30 - M-1 Kid's Champion Carnival '09||Tokyo, Japan|| Decision || 3 ||
|-
! style=background:white colspan=9 |
|- style="background:#CCFFCC;"
| 2009-10-04|| Win || align="left" | Keigo Nagura ||M-1 Muay Thai Amateur 29, Final||Tokyo, Japan|| Decision ||  ||
|- style="background:#CCFFCC;"
| 2009-10-04|| Win || align="left" | Ryoma ||M-1 Muay Thai Amateur 29, Semi Final||Tokyo, Japan|| Decision ||  ||
|- style="background:#CCFFCC;"
| 2009-08-02|| Win || align="left" | Ryoma ||Hachioji Fight Club||Tokyo, Japan|| Decision ||  ||
|-
| colspan=9 | Legend:

See also
 List of female kickboxers
 List of WPMF female world champions
 List of WBC Muaythai female world champions

References 

Japanese Muay Thai practitioners
1999 births
Living people
Sportspeople from Tokyo
People from Hachiōji, Tokyo